Zielonowo may refer to:

Zielonowo, Greater Poland Voivodeship (west-central Poland)
Zielonowo, Kuyavian-Pomeranian Voivodeship (north-central Poland)
Zielonowo, Warmian-Masurian Voivodeship (north Poland)
Zielonowo, West Pomeranian Voivodeship (north-west Poland)